Dina Temple-Raston is a Belgian-born American journalist and award-winning author.  She is a member of NPR's Breaking News Investigations team and was previously the creator, host, and correspondent of NPR's "I'll Be Seeing You" radio specials on technologies that watch us. She also created, hosted and reported an Audible podcast called "What Were You Thinking," which Entertainment Weekly named as one of the best new podcasts of 2018 Feb 23 issue, saying it was "a provocative series which tells the stories of teenagers who've made the worst kinds of choices -- joining ISIS, planning a school shooting -- before analyzing the impulses behind them." In a review, The Washington Post wrote that it was "the podcast every parent needs to hear."

Temple-Raston had previously served as NPR's counter-terrorism correspondent for more than a decade and she is the author of four award-winning books of narrative non-fiction including A Death in Texas: A Story of Race, Murder and a Small Town's Struggle for Redemption, about the James Byrd murder in Jasper, Texas; and "The Jihad Next Door: Rough Justice in the Age of Terror," which looks at being Muslim in America post 9-11.

Early life and education
Temple-Raston was born in Brussels, Belgium, on 25 August 1965 or 1964. Her first language was French. She graduated from Redwood High School in Larkspur, California, in 1982. She received her Bachelor of Arts with honors from Northwestern University in 1986.  She went on to study at Liaoning University, Shenyang, China, graduating with a degree in Chinese Language in 1989.  In 2006, she earned a master's degree in journalism from New York's Columbia University.

Journalistic career
In March 2007, she joined the staff of NPR and traveled all over the world covering terrorism attacks and trends. She took a leave in 2017 to create the "What Were You Thinking" podcast, the first season of which was released in 2018. She was chosen for a Nieman Fellowship at Harvard in 2013. These fellowships are given to mid-career journalists. She previously worked as City Hall Bureau Chief for the New York Sun, as a producer for CNNfn and as a White House correspondent for Bloomberg News.  One of the news services earliest employees, Temple-Raston was recruited while living in Asia and opened Bloomberg's Shanghai and Hong Kong offices and covered financial markets and economics for both USA Today and CNNfn. She began her professional career as special foreign assistant for the Liaoning Provincial Government, Shenyang, China, followed by a stint with AsiaWeek in Hong Kong.

Bibliography 
Her first book, A Death in Texas, about the aftermath of a white supremacist murder in a small town, won the Barnes & Noble Discover Great New Writers Program Award and was chosen as one of The Washington Post'''s Best Books of 2002.  Her second work, Justice on the Grass, on the role the radio station Radio Mille Collines played in the 1994 Rwandan genocide, was a Foreign Affairs magazine bestseller.  She has written extensively on civil liberties and national security, including In Defense of Our America (co-written with Anthony D. Romero) on civil liberties in post-9/11 America.  The Jihad Next Door'' is her fourth work of non-fiction was published in 2007 and is about the Lackawanna Six, America's first  sleeper cell.

References 

American women journalists
American reporters and correspondents
NPR personalities
Counterterrorism
Columbia University Graduate School of Journalism alumni
Liaoning University alumni
Northwestern University alumni
1965 births
Living people
21st-century American journalists
21st-century American non-fiction writers
21st-century American women writers
American women non-fiction writers
Belgian emigrants to the United States
Redwood High School (Larkspur, California) alumni